Reza Ghassemi (born 1949) is an Iranian novelist and musician.

Life 
Ghassemi was born in Esfahan. Besides his activities as a writer he is also involved in exercising classical Iranian music and a master of the Persian lute, the Setar. He has composed songs for the Iranian maestro Shahram Nazeri and been on stage with leading Iranian vocalists, such as maestri Mohammad Reza Shajarian and Sepideh Raissadat.

His best-known composition is the last track on the best-selling classical Iranian album Gol-e Sadbarg, released in 1984. This album, which includes compositions from Jalal Zolfonoun and Shahram Nazeri as well as Reza Ghassemi, is believed to have had the most influential effect on young Iranian artists who initially were reluctant to learn the Setar.

Since the release of the album Gol-e Sadbarg, the Setar has enjoyed much more popularity among Iranians. In truth, Ghassemi and his two famous colleagues, mentioned above, began a new era in Iranian classical music.
Though he lives in France, Ghassemi has not given up teaching Iranian music. Farrokhzad Layegh has studied the Setar with Mr. Ghassemi.

Reza Ghassemi's latest album 14 Cheerful Pieces with the voice of Iranian vocalist Sepideh Raissadat was released on October 25, 2010, in France (by Buda Musique Records).

He has published three novels so far: Nocturnal Orchestra of Woods (1996), The Well of Babel (1999) and The Spell Chanted by Lambs (2002). Some of his works have been translated into French. The Spell Chanted by Lambs is his first work in English.
Reza Ghassemi has also directed an award-winning film In Full Bloom (2019).

Awards 
2002 Hooshang Golshiri Literary Award, Best First Novel, The Nocturnal Harmony
2002 The writers and critical award
2002 PEKA Award
2010 The writers and critical award

Albums 
  14 Cheerful Pieces (rel. Oct. 2010)
  Dashti-Mahour (rel. 1992)
 Improvisation in Esfahan – Rast Panjgah
 Siavash Khani (Chahargah)
 Gol-e Sadbarg (rel. 1984)

Publications
 Reza Ghassemi, 1996 - Nocturnal Orchestra of Woods
 Reza Ghassemi, 1999 - The Well of Babel
 Reza Ghassemi, 2002 - The Spell Chanted by Lambs

See also 
 List of Iranian writers
 List of Iranian musicians

References 

 A critic (in farsi) of his latest album (14 Cheerful Pieces) with Sepideh Raissadat
 A critic on his book
 An interview with Ghassemi in Radio Zamaneh

External links
 Ghassemi's personal website
 IMDb
 [https://www.abebooks.com/book-search/author/reza-ghassemi/ List of Reza Ghassemi's publications
 PARSAGON
 Nocturnal Harmony from The Wood Orchestra: A Persian Novel, Reza Ghassemi at goodreads

1949 births
Date of birth missing (living people)
Living people
Iranian writers